Anthony Brenner (born November 28, 1959) is a Canadian-born German former ice hockey player. Brenner is currently the head coach for the Deggendorfer SC U16 team.

Brenner played 18 seasons of professional hockey in Germany. He began his coaching career during the 2010-11 season as the head coach of the Deggendorfer SC U16 squad.

References

External links

Living people
1959 births
Canadian ice hockey forwards
German ice hockey coaches
German ice hockey players